PA20 may refer to:
 Aubert PA-20 Cigale, a French prototype light aircraft built in 1938
 Pennsylvania's 20th congressional district
 Piper PA-20 Pacer, an American high-wing light aircraft first built in 1949
 Pitcairn PA-20, an American autogyro of the 1930s
 U.S. Route 20 in Pennsylvania